Geumosan may refer to:

 Geumosan (North Gyeongsang), a mountain in South Korea
 Geumosan (South Gyeongsang), a mountain in South Korea
 Geumosan (South Jeolla), a mountain in South Korea